"In Throes of Increasing Wonder..." is the series premiere of the American gothic horror television series Interview with the Vampire, an adaptation of Anne Rice's novel of the same name. Written by series creator Rolin Jones and directed by executive producer Alan Taylor, the episode premiered in the United States on AMC on October 2, 2022.

The plot depicts the beginning of the interview session between Louis de Pointe du Lac and Daniel Molloy about Louis' life story as a vampire, particularly since meeting Lestat de Lioncourt in 1910 in New Orleans.

The episode received critical acclaim, with praise going towards the premise, directing, writing, tone, cinematography, score, production design, costumes, characterization, and performances of Anderson and Reid.

Plot 
In 2022, journalist Daniel Molloy (Eric Bogosian) receives a package in the mail from his old friend Louis de Pointe du Lac (Jacob Anderson) who lives in Dubai. The package contains a series of tapes and a handwritten letter, offering to conduct a do-over interview with him, a project that both had undertaken, 49 years ago, but failed to finish as it ended with Louis attacking Molloy which was sparked by Molloy's "disrespectful" remarks to Louis about "human life". As soon as Molloy arrives at Louis' penthouse apartment in Dubai, the two begins their first interview session.

Louis' story goes back to the year 1910. He works as a pimp and owns eight brothels, inherited from his father after his passing. One night, Louis gets into an argument with his brother Paul (Steven G. Norfleet), instigated by Paul praying outside the brothel and bothering one of Louis' workers, leading to the latter pulling a knife on the former. Also at the scene, vampire Lestat de Lioncourt (Sam Reid) witnesses the argument.

Louis later meets Lestat while visiting Miss Lily (Najah Bradley), a sex worker with whom he covers up his closeted homosexuality and whom he has affection for, at her workplace. Louis finds her talking to Lestat and interrupts their conversation. As Lestat continues to talk and tease Lily, Louis finds himself unable to move. The following night, Louis and Lestat meet again in a game of cards. During the game, Lestat communicates with Louis telepathically while, at the same time, physically talking to the other players. He then freezes time and switches the other players' cards around, leading to Louis ultimately winning the game. As a result, the two begins to develop a friendship.

Lestat is later invited by Louis to have dinner with the Du Lac family. During dinner talk, Paul's question to Lestat about whether he is "one with Christ" angers him and causes him to almost use his powers on the family but is immediately stopped by Louis. Afterwards, Lestat brings Louis to his place and brings Louis to Miss Lily, who is waiting upstairs. The three then have a threesome, while Lestat seduces Louis telepathically. After Lily falls asleep, Louis and Lestat share a passionate kiss. Lestat then bites Louis' neck and the two levitate. However, despite liking it, the feelings terrify Louis, and he decides to stop seeing Lestat again.

The morning after Grace's wedding, Paul commits suicide in front of Louis by jumping off their house's roof. His mother blames him and accuses him of saying something that led to Paul's death. Later, Lestat ambushes Paul's funeral and asks Louis to come to him. Louis, who has had enough of his mother's blame, chooses not to go to the wake. Tormented by Lestat's constant mind control on him, he decides to go to the church for help. While Louis confesses his sins in a confessional, Lestat enters the church and kills the priests. In response, Louis draws a knife and stabs Lestat several times. Eventually, Louis allows himself to be turned into a vampire after hearing Lestat's words that it will help him overcome his sorrow.

Production

Conception and writing 
On May 13, 2020, AMC Networks announced that it had made an agreement to acquire two of Anne Rice's literary works, The Vampire Chronicles and Lives of the Mayfair Witches, consisting of 18 novels. On June 24, 2021, the series was given an order for an eight-episode first season by AMC, adapting the first novel of The Vampire Chronicles novel series, Interview with the Vampire, scheduled to premiere in 2022. Rolin Jones was announced to serve as writer, executive producer, and showrunner. Mark Johnson, Rice and her son Christopher were also named executive producers. On July 19, 2021, Alan Taylor was announced to also executive produce the series and direct the first two episodes of the first season. The series premiere "In Throes of Increasing Wonder..." was written solely by Jones.

Casting 
In August 2021, Sam Reid and Jacob Anderson were announced to have been cast in the lead roles of Lestat de Lioncourt and Louis de Pointe du Lac, respectively. On October 13, 2021, Kalyne Coleman was cast in a recurring role as Grace, Louis' sister. In March 2022, Assad Zaman and Eric Bogosian were cast as Rashid and Daniel Molloy, respectively.

Filming 
Principal photography for the first season began on November 8, 2021, and completed on May 18, 2022, with filming taking place in New Orleans. Among several filming locations, the Beauregard-Keyes House served as the façade of the Du Lac's family house, while the inside of the Gallier House served as the interiors of the family home. Apart from real-life locations, filming also took place on newly built sets, including Storyville. Executive producer Alan Taylor served as the episode's director, while David Tattersall worked as the cinematographer.

Release 
"In Throes of Increasing Wonder..." premiered on AMC, on October 2, 2022, but was released one week earlier on the network's streaming service AMC+.

Reception

Ratings 
On linear television, an estimated 0.622 million viewers watched "In Throes of Increasing Wonder..." during its first broadcast on AMC, with a 0.15 ratings share. Across all platforms, according to AMC Networks, 1.2 million viewers watched the premiere on AMC, including 0.493 million adults aged 25–54, in Nielsen live+3 ratings, making the series the number one new drama on ad-supported cable in 2022. On AMC+, the series premiere ranked as the number one new series launch ever and put the series alongside The Walking Dead and Better Call Saul as one of the network's top three new or returning series, based on the opening weekend performance alone.

Critical reception 

The episode was met with critical acclaim. On the review aggregator Rotten Tomatoes, it holds an approval rating of 100% based on five reviews, with an average rating of 8.8/10. Tony Sokol of Den of Geek gave the episode a rating of 5/5 stars and said, "'In Throes of Increasing Wonder' is a fully satisfying introductory course, serving up preface as first chapter. [...] [It] is a hunt, and at the end, viewers will be trapped. It opens a whole new vein." Sokol also praised the production design, tone, characterization, and performances of Anderson and Reid. Kathleen Walsh of Vulture gave it 4/5 stars and praised its writing, premise, and the whole sequence at the church. From Greg Wheeler of The Review Geek, it also received 4/5 stars. In his review, Wheeler wrote, "Interview With The Vampire gets off to a good start, with some beautiful cinematography, gorgeous characterization and a smart premise." Whitney Evans of TV Fanatic gave it a score of 4.8/5 and lauded the performances of Anderson and Reid. Sean T. Collins of Decider, called it a "marvelously melodramatic production" and praised Jones' writing, Taylor's directing, Hart's score, the costumes, set design, and Anderson's and Reid's performances. In his review of the first season, Daniel Fienberg of The Hollywood Reporter praised Jones' writing and Taylor's directing in the episode, especially for making sense of the relationship between Louis and Lestat and "[letting them] embrace their queer identities."

The episode was listed by several publications as one of the best television episodes of 2022. /Film ranked it as the tenth best TV episode of the year and wrote, "'In Throes of Increasing Wonder...' is the dazzling, Alan Taylor-directed first outing that seamlessly melds Rice's existing story with new updates, and introduces a firecracker cast led by Jacob Anderson's brooding Louis, Eric Bogosian's deadpan reporter Daniel, and the wild-eyed, delightfully malevolent vampire Lestat, embodied perfectly by Sam Reid. [...] [It] is a variety pack of indelibly dark and entertaining moments. [...] [It] also grounds the story in genuine emotion, revealing the unique strain Louis faces as a Black businessman in 1910 New Orleans." Meanwhile, Primetimer included it in its unraked list of "Best TV Episodes of 2022". Syfy Wire listed the episode as one of the "best sci-fi and horror TV episodes of 2022" and said that it was "smart, richly produced, and perfectly acted" and that it "[gave us] a fresh take and an updating of Rice's book and mythology that honors her world but also in some ways makes it better." In addition, TV Guide included it in its "6 Shows and Episodes That Blew Up the Group Chat in 2022" list.

References

External links 
 

2022 American television episodes
American LGBT-related television episodes
American television series premieres
Television episodes about vampires